Yeshiva Rabbi Samson Raphael Hirsch (YRSRH, also known as Breuer's, after its creator) was founded in New York City in 1944, as a means of reestablishing the Orthodox Jewish community of Frankfurt, Germany in the United States. The school, founded by Rabbi Joseph Breuer, is run according to the philosophy of Rabbi Breuer's grandfather, Rabbi Samson Raphael Hirsch. It is located in the Upper Manhattan neighborhood of Washington Heights.

The institution has several divisions, including separate elementary, middle and high schools for boys and girls, and post high school Talmudic academy. 
It also maintained The "Rika Breuer Teacher's Seminary" for many years, which was discontinued in 2004; it was headed by Rabbi Joseph Elias.

It is under the general auspices of Khal Adath Jeshurun, which is an Orthodox kehilla that serves the mostly German-Jewish community of Washington Heights and Fort Tryon in upper Manhattan.

See also
Samson Raphael Hirsch
Torah Lehranstalt
Joseph Breuer
Shimon Schwab
Alfredo Goldschmidt (rabbi)

German Wikipedia 

Former Samson Raphael Hirsch School in Frankfurt am Main, Germany

References

External links
 Official website.

Samson Raphael Hirsch
Private middle schools in Manhattan
Private high schools in Manhattan
Private elementary schools in Manhattan
Educational institutions established in 1944
Washington Heights, Manhattan
1944 establishments in New York City